Cicurina japonica is a spider species found in Korea and Japan (introduced in Europe).

See also 
 List of Dictynidae species

References

External links 

Hahniidae
Spiders of Asia
Chelicerates of Japan
Arthropods of Korea
Spiders described in 1886
Spiders of Europe